Jack Lancaster (31 March 1919 – 25 March 1993) was  a former Australian rules footballer who played with Fitzroy in the Victorian Football League (VFL).

Notes

External links 
		

1919 births
1993 deaths
Australian rules footballers from Victoria (Australia)
Fitzroy Football Club players